The Hongqi H9 is a full-size luxury car produced by the FAW Group under the Hongqi marque.

History 
The H9 was presented in April 2020. It has been on the Chinese market since August 2020. A stretched version of the H9, the H9+, was released in 2021. It can be distinguished from the normal H9 by a larger & Chromed B-pillar.

The vehicle was launched in Dubai in December 2020.

Technical specifications

The H9 is powered either by a two-liter turbocharged gasoline engine plus a 48V mild hybrid system with 185 kW (252 hp) or a three-liter supercharged gasoline engine with 208 kW (283 hp). Both variants have rear-wheel drive and a 7-speed dual clutch transmission.

References

External links 

 Official Website

H9
Cars of China
Cars introduced in 2020
Flagship vehicles
Limousines
Luxury vehicles
Full-size vehicles
Rear-wheel-drive vehicles
Hybrid electric cars